Leosthenes (in Greek Λεωσθένης; died 361 BC) was an Athenian, who commanded a fleet and armament in the Cyclades in 361 BC. Having allowed himself to be surprised by Alexander, tyrant of Pherae, and defeated, with a loss of five triremes and 600 men, he was condemned to death by the Athenians, as a punishment for his ill success.

References
Smith, William (editor); Dictionary of Greek and Roman Biography and Mythology, "Leosthenes (1)", Boston, (1867)

Notes

Ancient Athenian admirals
4th-century BC Athenians
361 BC deaths
Year of birth unknown
People executed by ancient Athens